A fluoropolymer is a fluorocarbon-based polymer with multiple  carbon–fluorine bonds.  It is characterized by a high resistance to solvents, acids, and bases. The best known fluoropolymer is polytetrafluoroethylene under the brand name "Teflon," trademarked by the DuPont Company.

History

In 1938, polytetrafluoroethylene (DuPont brand name Teflon) was discovered by accident by a recently hired DuPont Ph.D., Roy J. Plunkett. While working with tetrafluoroethylene gas to develop refrigerants, he noticed that a previously pressurized cylinder had no pressure remaining.  In dissecting the cylinder, he found a mass of white solid in a quantity similar to that of the tetrafluoroethylene gas. It was determined that this material was a new-to-the-world polymer.  Tests showed the substance was resistant to corrosion from most acids, bases and solvents and had better high temperature stability than any other plastic. By early 1941, a crash program was making substantial quantities of PTFE for the Manhattan Project.

Properties
Fluoropolymers share the properties of fluorocarbons in that they are not as susceptible to the van der Waals force as hydrocarbons.  This contributes to their non-stick and friction reducing properties. Also, they are stable due to the stability multiple carbon–fluorine bonds add to a chemical compound. Fluoropolymers may be mechanically characterized as thermosets or thermoplastics. Fluoropolymers can be homopolymers or Copolymer.

Examples of monomers used to prepare fluoropolymers
 Perfluorocycloalkene (PFCA)
 Ethylene (Ethane) (E)
 Vinyl fluoride (fluoroethylene) (VF1)
 Vinylidene fluoride (1,1-difluoroethylene) (VDF or VF2)
 Tetrafluoroethylene (TFE)
 Chlorotrifluoroethylene (CTFE)
 Propylene (P)
 Hexafluoropropylene (HFP)
 Perfluoropropylvinylether (PPVE)
 Perfluoromethylvinylether (PMVE)

Current market and forecast
The global demand on fluoropolymers was estimated at US$7.25 billion in 2011. Driven by new developments of products, applications, and processes, as well as strong demands in new markets, the demand is expected to grow by 5.8% in the following years.

Some of the world's largest manufacturers of fluoropolymers include DuPont, 3M, Solvay Chemicals, BASF and Dyneon.

Examples of fluoropolymers

Typical properties

See also
Organofluorine
Organohalogen
Fluorosurfactant
Perfluorocycloalkene (PFCA)

References

 
Organofluorides
Polymers
Thermoplastics